The 1964 North Dakota gubernatorial election was held on November 3, 1964. Incumbent Democrat William L. Guy defeated Republican nominee Donald M. Halcrow with 55.74% of the vote.

Primary elections
Primary elections were held on June 30, 1964.

Republican primary

Candidates
Donald M. Halcrow, State Representative
Robert P. McCarney

Results

General election

Candidates
William L. Guy, Democratic
Donald M. Halcrow, Republican

Results

References

1964
North Dakota
Gubernatorial